Roh, also Ro, is a village on the north coast of Maré Island, in the Loyalty Islands of New Caledonia. It overlooks Nord Bay.

References

Populated places in Maré Island